Cyperus pohlii is a species of sedge that is native to southern parts of tropical South America.

See also 
 List of Cyperus species

References 

pohlii
Plants described in 1854
Flora of Argentina
Flora of Brazil
Flora of Bolivia
Flora of Ecuador
Flora of Paraguay
Flora of Venezuela
Taxa named by Ernst Gottlieb von Steudel